The Kiddies in the Ruins is a 1918 British silent war film directed by George Pearson and starring Emmy Lynn, Hugh E. Wright and Georges Colin. It was released two days after the Armistice that halted fighting in the First World War and depicts the lives of children living in war-devastated France.

Cast
 Emmy Lynn as Françoise Regnard
 Hugh E. Wright as Tommy
 Georges Colin as Maurice Regnard
 Simone Prévost as Nini
 Georges Merouze as Grandpa
 Berthe Jalabert as Grandma

References

Bibliography
 Kelly, Andrew. Cinema and the Great War. Routledge, 1997.

External links

1918 films
British war films
1910s English-language films
Films set in France
Films directed by George Pearson
British silent short films
British black-and-white films
1918 war films
Silent war films
1910s British films